The Kellys and the O'Kellys is a novel by Anthony Trollope. It was written in Ireland and published in 1848.

References

External links 

 
 Plot summary from the Trollope Society

1848 British novels
Novels by Anthony Trollope